The Sarvaiya also spelled Sarvaiyya, Sarvia, Sarwia are a social group of India, mainly found in Gujarat.

History

The Sarvaiyas come from a branch of the Chudasamas, who are themselves a branch of the Samma Rajputs. They consider themselves to be brethren and such do not intermarry. Like the Chudasamas, they worship Khodiyar as their common Kuldevi.

 

Their name derives from the estate of Sarva, which they once ruled. Among other estates that they ruled were Amreli, Hathasnsi, Jesar, Datha, Vasavad, Santhli, Chital, Kundla, Gohilwad, Chhatrasa, Chiroda, Chok, Pan, Ranigam, and other estates in Kathiawar.

 

Sarvaiya kingdom like the Chudasamas, were attacked in 1476 by Sultan Mahmud Begada . When Mahmud Begada, attacked Amreli, after taking over Junagadh from Chudasama, the Sarvaiya rulers of Amreli notably the two brothers Jesaji and Vejaji for fighting against troops of Sultan Mahmud Begda, became outlaws, in order to re conquer Amreli. Jesaji and Vejaji were able to get jagir of 64 villages from sultanate of Mohmud Begda after fighting by remaining in outlawry for twelve years. Subsequently they settled in Hathasni. Later, the brothers divided the new estate between them, Jesoji receiving Hathasni and Vejoji estate of Jesar.

References

Social groups of Gujarat